Raya Embury-Brown (born 20 October 2004) is a swimmer from the Cayman Islands. She represented Cayman Islands at the 2019 World Aquatics Championships held in Gwangju, South Korea. She competed in the women's 400 metre freestyle and women's 800 metre freestyle events. In both events she did not advance to compete in the final. She also competed in the 4 × 100 metre mixed freestyle relay event.

In 2019, she won the silver medal in both the women's 800 metre freestyle and women's 1500 metre freestyle events at the Island Games in Gibraltar.

She represented the Cayman Islands at the 2022 Commonwealth Games held in Birmingham, England.

References 

Living people
2004 births
Place of birth missing (living people)
Caymanian female swimmers
Caymanian female freestyle swimmers
Swimmers at the 2022 Commonwealth Games
Commonwealth Games competitors for the Cayman Islands